Stod can refer to:

Places
 Stod (Czech Republic), a town
 Stod, Norway, a former municipality
 Stod River, a river in India

Other
 Stød, a phenomenon in Danish phonology
 Stod IL, a sports club in Steinkjer, Norway

See also
 Stöð 1, Stöð 2, Stöð 2 Extra, Stöð 2 Sport 2 — Icelandic television channels.